Doliops edithae is a species of beetle in the family Cerambycidae. It was described by Vives in 2009.

References

Doliops
Beetles described in 2009